Zhang Kechun born in 1980 in Sichuan province is a Chinese artist and photographer. He is known for his photographs dwelling on the significance of the landscape in modern Chinese national identity. He currently lives and works in Chengdu, China.

Biography
Zhang's first series The Yellow River documents the effects of modernisation along the third longest river in Asia.
His second series, Between the Mountains and the Water, continued to explore the relationship between the people and land on which they live and work.

Zhang Kechun won the National Geographic Picks Global Prize in 2008, the Daylight Photo Award and the Arles Photo Festival Discovery Award in 2014. He was nominated by the Three Shadow Photo Award in 2012, Sony World Photography Awards in 2012 and 2013, and by the Prix HSBC Pour la Photographie in 2014.

His works have been collected internationally by many other museums and private collectors from the USA, France, Germany, Japan and China such as Chinese Image and Video Archive in Canada, Williams College Museum of Art, USA and the China Central Academy of Fine Arts.

Exhibitions
2020:

 BredaPhoto, The best of Times the worst of times

2016:
 The Yellow River, Landskrona, Sweden
 Between the Mountains and Water, La Galerie, Hong-Kong
 Art Souterrain, Montréal, Québec
2015:The Yellow River, La Galerie, Hong-Kong
2014 : Les Rencontres d'Arles, Arles, France
2013 :
 The 4th edition of Photoquai world photography biennale, Musée du Quai Branly, Paris, France
 The 6th L'Iris d'Or Award Exhibition, Somerset House, London, UK
 Collection Exhibition, 1st Beijing Photo Biennial, China Millennium Monument, Beijing, China
 Delhi International Photography Festival, Delhi, India
 The 5th Dali International Photography Biennale, Dali, China
 The 6th Look 3 Festival of the Photograph, Charlottesville, USA
 The 3rd Chengdu Multi-dimensional View Photo Exhibition, Fanmate Art Museum, Chengdu, China
 Remote Places, Close Spaces, Street Level Photoworks, Glasgow, United Kingdom
 The 1st Future Master Exhibition, Winshare Art Museum, Chengdu, China
2012:
 Get It Louder, Sanlitun Village, Beijing, China
 The Interactions Yixian International Photo Festival, Yixia, China
 The 8th Angkor Photography Festival, Siem Reap, Cambodia
 There there Photographic Exhibition, Cork City, Ireland
 The 4th Jinan International Photography Biennale, Jinan, China
 Future Exhibition, China Central Academy of Fine Arts Museum, Beijing, China
 The 2013 Three Shadows Photography Award Exhibition, Three Shadows Photography Art Centre, Beijing, China
2010
 Right In Front of Your Eyes, Chengdu International Photography Center, Chengdu, China
 Southern Documentary Photography Exhibition, Guangdong, China

Awards
 National Geographic Picks Global Contest (2008)
 Sony World Photography Awards, shortlisted (2013)
 Discovery Award at Les Rencontres d'Arles for The Yellow River (2014)

Collections
 Chinese Image and Video Archive, Canada
 Williams College Museum of Art, USA
 China Central Academy of Fine Arts, China

References

External links
 La Galerie, Paris 1839, Hong-Kong

1980 births
Chinese photographers
Living people
Artists from Sichuan